is a train station in the city of Azumino, Nagano Prefecture, Japan, operated by East Japan Railway Company (JR East).

Lines
Ariake Station is served by the Ōito Line and is 18.4 kilometers from the terminus of the line at Matsumoto Station.

Station layout
The station consists of one ground-level island platform serving a two tracks, connected to the station building by a footbridge. The station is a Kan'i itaku station.

Platforms

History
Ariake Station opened on 8 August 1915. With the privatization of Japanese National Railways (JNR) on 1 April 1987, the station came under the control of JR East.

Passenger statistics
In fiscal 2015, the station was used by an average of 777 passengers daily (boarding passengers only).

Surrounding area

Takasegwa River

See also
 List of railway stations in Japan

References

External links

 JR East station information 

Railway stations in Nagano Prefecture
Ōito Line
Railway stations in Japan opened in 1915
Stations of East Japan Railway Company
Azumino, Nagano